The 21st Ryder Cup Matches were held September 19–21 at Laurel Valley Golf Club in Ligonier, Pennsylvania.
The United States team won the competition by a score of 21 to 11 points. After the competition, questions started to be asked about the future of the event, as Britain and Ireland had once again failed to seriously challenge the United States team. The next time the competition was held in the U.S. in 1979, the visiting team included players from continental Europe.

Laurel Valley was co-founded by U.S. captain Arnold Palmer and had hosted the PGA Championship a decade earlier, in 1965.

Format
The Ryder Cup is a match play event, with each match worth one point.  The competition format was adjusted slightly from the 1973 Ryder Cup, with the second day sessions being swapped:
Day 1 — 4 foursome (alternate shot) matches in a morning session and 4 four-ball (better ball) matches in an afternoon session
Day 2 — 4 four-ball matches in a morning session and 4 foursome matches in an afternoon session
Day 3 — 16 singles matches, 8 each in morning and afternoon sessions
With a total of 32 points, 16 points were required to win the Cup.  All matches were played to a maximum of 18 holes.

Teams
Source:

Eight members of the Great Britain and Ireland team were chosen from the money leaders in 1975 European Tour events after the Benson & Hedges Festival on 16 August, with the remaining four members of the 12-man team selected by a committee. The eight automatic selections were: Eamonn Darcy, Maurice Bembridge, Brian Barnes, Bernard Gallacher, Norman Wood, John O'Leary, Guy Hunt and Brian Huggett. The committee chose two US-based players, Tony Jacklin and Peter Oosterhuis, together with Christy O'Connor Jnr and Tommy Horton. Horton was selected despite finishing 15th in the points list, making his debut at the age of 34.

Neil Coles withdrew from consideration because of his fear of flying and because it was impractical to travel by sea.

Friday's matches

Morning foursomes

Afternoon four-ball

Saturday's matches

Morning four-ball

Afternoon foursomes

Sunday's matches

Morning singles

Afternoon singles

Individual player records
Each entry refers to the win–loss–half record of the player.

Source:

United States

Great Britain and Ireland

References

External links
PGA of America: 1975 Ryder Cup
About.com: 1975 Ryder Cup

Ryder Cup
Golf in Pennsylvania
Ryder Cup
Ryder Cup
Ryder Cup
Ryder Cup